Agnia casta is a species of beetle in the family Cerambycidae. It was described by Newman in 1842. It is known from the Philippines.

References

Lamiini
Beetles described in 1842